The Asia Plaza is a vision supertall skyscraper that will rise  in Kaohsiung, Taiwan. The building will comprise 103 floors above ground as well as 7 basement levels. It is a part of the Asia Plaza Tri-Tower Complex, that comprise three buildings: the 103-storey Asia Plaza, the 49-storey Far Eastern Ding Ding Hotel and the 18-storey Mega'21 Far Eastern Shopping Complex, of which only the shopping complex was completed in 2001.   

The building was proposed in 1997 and was originally scheduled to start construction in 2004 upon the completion of the Mega'21 Far Eastern Shopping Complex. It was planned to be completed in 2008. However, the development schedule has been delayed several times, and construction is currently scheduled to start in 2021 and be completed in 2024. After the building is complete, Asia Plaza will surpass 85 Sky Tower to become the tallest skyscraper in Kaohsiung City and the second tallest building in Taiwan.

See also
 List of tallest buildings in Kaohsiung
 List of buildings with 100 floors or more
 List of tallest buildings in the world
 List of tallest buildings in Taiwan
 List of future tallest buildings
 List of supertall skyscrapers

References 

Proposed skyscrapers in Taiwan
Proposed buildings and structures in Taiwan
Skyscraper office buildings in Kaohsiung